Coes was a Greek military commander of Mytilene. He supported King Darius Hystaspes of Persia in his Scythian expedition (c. 513 BC) as commander of the Mytilenaeans. Coes dissuaded the king from breaking up his bridge of boats over the Danube, and so cutting off his own retreat. For this good counsel, he was appointed by Darius on his return as the new tyrant of Mytilene.

In 499 BC, when the Ionians had been encouraged to revolt by Aristagoras, Coes, with several of the other tyrants, was seized by Aristagoras at Myus, where the Persian fleet that had been engaged at Naxos was lying. They were delivered up to the people of their cities. Most of them were allowed to go unhurt into exile other than Coes, who was stoned to death by the Mytileneans.

References

Ancient Mytileneans
Ancient Greek tyrants
6th-century BC Greek people
Executed ancient Greek people
Achaemenid Thrace
Ionian Revolt
5th-century BC executions
People executed by stoning
Year of birth unknown
Rulers in the Achaemenid Empire
Ancient Greeks from the Achaemenid Empire
Military personnel of the Achaemenid Empire